The Laboratory of biomechanics (in French : Laboratoire de biomécanique), also known as the LBM, is a French laboratory of research located in Paris. It is under the authority of Arts et Métiers ParisTech. It is part of the Carnot Institute ARTS and currently employs more than 50 persons. It is officially recognized by the CNRS as a host research team (équipe d'acceuil n°4494).

Teaching and research topics 

The main part of the research is focused on the following lines :

Modeling of bones and muscle mechanical behavior
Improving of safety systems
analysis of nervous system/moves interactions

Research teams 

The laboratory is divided in five research teams, which have their own field of research :

team 1 : mechanical behavior of body and clinical research
team 2 : biomechanics of shocks, confort and safety in transportation
team 3 : biomechanics of tissues
team 4 : biomechanics, sports and health
team 5 : biomechanics and nervous system

Projects 

The LBM is working either with academic or industrial scientific partners. On the European scale, the laboratory is enrolled in 3 initiatives such as the CRAFT-Devaspim project which aims to develop a new kind of vertebral implants.
The laboratory is also behind the invention of the EOS imaging system in partnership with the Nobel Prize Georges Charpak.

Facilities and equipment 

The laboratory has many "high-tech" apparatuses, especially in the field of medical imaging. Among them, the EOS system that it developed and improved recently. It also have access to special equipment of the Hospital Henri Mondor, which includes a test platform for moves and walk.

The 20000+ square meters building of the laboratory was completely renewed in 2013.

Locations 

Arts et Métiers ParisTech
Hospital Henri Mondor

References and notes 

Laboratories of Arts et Métiers ParisTech
Laboratories in France
French National Centre for Scientific Research